Tombozine is an alkaloid found in the plant species Vinca minor. The chemical has been found to have a sedative effect in mice and to lower blood pressure in some domesticated animals.

References

Vinca alkaloids
Quinolizidine alkaloids
Tryptamine alkaloids
Quinuclidine alkaloids